World Peace is an American post-ironic comedy television series starring and created by sketch comedy group Million Dollar Extreme, which premiered on Adult Swim on August 5, 2016.

On December 5, 2016, the show was canceled by Adult Swim. It was available to stream on the Adult Swim website until its removal on June 12, 2020.

Premise
Each episode of World Peace was the Adult Swim standard of eleven minutes in length, and starred Million Dollar Extreme troupe leader Sam Hyde and frequent collaborators Nick Rochefort and Charls Carroll. Erick Hayden, another MDE sketch collaborator, also appeared in four episodes in an "also starring" role. Andrew Ruse, who worked with the troupe in the past, directed the series in addition to serving as writer and executive producer alongside Sam, Nick and Charls.

The show claimed to be set in a post-apocalyptic nightmare world that satirizes the current political climate. Each episode was made up of multiple sketches, connected by hyper stylized transitional graphics. The end of each episode featured a musical guest (though each guest's performance was incomplete and was used to provide a bed of closing credits music).

History

Production
On May 7, 2015, it was announced that Adult Swim had ordered an untitled pilot by Million Dollar Extreme described as a "sketch show ... set in an almost present-day post-apocalyptic nightmare world". Based on that pilot, it was announced on March 3, 2016, that it would go to series with the group presenting it under the additional subtitle World Peace, and the first season consisting of six episodes under the network's traditional eleven-minute episode structure. The show was produced in-house by Rent Now Productions, Inc., and shot in Atlanta, Georgia. The show additionally benefitted from the Georgia production tax credit.

According to a YouTube interview with Sam Hyde, the network's marketing department produced billboard proofs with over-the-top tag lines such as "World Peace is Racist, Hateful, and Takes No Prisoners." Hyde claimed this sabotaged the marketing by forcing him to reject the marketing team's ideas resulting in no billboards for the series. Hyde also claimed that one of the Williams Street production staff was fired from her position after a failed attempt to break into the show's editing suite to delete the show's footage, and that Million Dollar Extreme members were confronted at an Adult Swim company party by someone saying she was going to get them fired.

Controversy
BuzzFeed News writer Joseph Bernstein was active in criticizing the show after a heated interview with creator Sam Hyde. He wrote that a source told him the network's standards departments repeatedly discovered and removed "coded racist messages, including hidden swastikas". Hyde addressed these allegations in a YouTube response, asserting these claims were complete fabrications. In the same article, Adult Swim series creator Brett Gelman claimed that the show is "an instrument of hate." Gelman would later cut ties with the network over Mike Lazzo's comments regarding women in the workplace, while also citing the network's greenlighting of World Peace as playing a significant part in the decision. Gelman's business collaborator, Tim Heidecker, also voiced his support for Gelman's decision to leave the network on Facebook. In addition to claims of coded messages, news sources such as The Atlantic also detailed the controversial actual content of the show, which "seem to exist only to shock and offend", including a sketch in which "Hyde appears in blackface, screaming at a woman in exaggerated vernacular".

Reception

The show premiered to 1,033,000 viewers, with its audience varied week-to-week by a range of 290,000 viewers and average of 896,720 viewers. The finale was its highest-rated episode, with 1,053,000 viewers.

Cancellation
Adult Swim announced on December 5, 2016, that the show would not be renewed for a second season. The network faced internal opposition to its continuation, mainly regarding accusations of Hyde's documents connections to the alt-right. According to Hyde, despite Adult Swim executives' apparent interest to pick up the show for a second season, Turner ultimately decided to cancel the show. Hyde also accused Tim Heidecker of being against the series due to his political views, and using his influence with network executives to prevent its renewal for a second season, though Heidecker denied this multiple times.

Following the cancellation, musicians whose work was featured on the show, including Molly Nilsson, Chastity Belt, Ovlov, and 3Teeth, disavowed the show. All four acts made the common claim that they were unaware of Million Dollar Extreme's beliefs or political views prior to meeting them or viewing their work. John Maus remained silent until a year later, when he told Noisey, "I never had, from what I know about it, any indication that anything other than certain instances of a sort of trolling was going on. What did they do that made them Nazis? Maybe I haven't looked into it."

Revival
In December 2022, Sam Hyde announced that he had secured funding for a spiritual successor to the show, simply titled "World Peace 2", and that they would start shooting in the spring. He had written a number of sketches.  Nick Rochefort and Erick Hayden were both set to return to the show as series regulars.  In February 2023, Charls Carroll announced that he would also be coming back for World Peace Season 2.

Episodes

References

Notes

External links
 

2010s American sketch comedy television series
2016 American television series debuts
2016 American television series endings
Alt-right
English-language television shows
Post-apocalyptic television series
Adult Swim original programming
Race-related controversies in television
Television controversies in the United States
Television series by Williams Street